Rhododendron campylogynum (独龙杜鹃), the bent-style rhododendron, is a rhododendron species native to northeast India and northeast Myanmar, where it grows at altitudes of . It is a small creeping or prostrate shrub that grows  in height, with leathery leaves, obovate to obovate-lanceolate in shape, up to 2.5 cm by 1.5 cm but often much smaller. The leaves are glandular and are strongly scented of myrrh when crushed. The flowers are  purplish red or pink colour and of a distinctive simple, somewhat nodding, bell shape, borne singly or in pairs on a short stalk.

In cultivation in the UK the Myrtilloides cultivar group has gained the Royal Horticultural Society’s Award of Garden Merit.

References

campylogynum